Thomas Charles Atkinson Hislop   
(29 November 1888 – 21 June 1965) was a New Zealand politician, lawyer, and diplomat. He served as the mayor of Wellington from 1931 to 1944.

Early life and family
Born in Wellington on 29 November 1888, Hislop was the son of Thomas William Hislop, who was mayor of Wellington from 1905 to 1908, and Annie Hislop (née Simpson). His grandfather was John Hislop. He attended Wellington College, and then the University of Cambridge where he graduated in law. In 1911, he was called to the bar as a barrister-at-law of Inner Temple, London.

In 1921, Hislop married Ailsa Craig Dalhousie Ramsay at St John's Church, Wellington.

Legal and military career
Hislop joined the Wellington legal firm of Brandon, Ward and Hislop in 1912. He enlisted in the Wellington Regiment in World War I in 1915, and saw active service at Gallipoli and in France. He was twice wounded, and returned to New Zealand in 1919 with the rank of captain, resuming legal practice.

Political career

Hislop was a Wellington city councillor from 1913 to 1915, when he resigned to serve in World War I. He became a councillor again from 1927 to 1931, and then mayor from 1931 to 1945.

He was the political leader of the Democrat Party organised by Albert Davy in 1934–35. The party was anti-socialist, but in the 1935 general election its main effect was to split the anti-Labour vote, and it disappeared soon afterwards. Hislop himself contested the  electorate and came last out of three candidates. He later became a member of the new National Party which the Democrat Party had merged into. At the  standing for the National Party in the  electorate, he came second but was beaten by Labour's Charles Chapman.

During World War II, Hislop was seen as a "remote, even erratic figure, and his right-wing views regularly brought him into conflict with the wartime Labour government", but the attack by some trade unionists on Hubert Nathan, a Jew and Citizens candidate for the Harbour Board, resulted in the defeat of all the Labour candidates to the Council in 1941.

In 1940 Noël Coward was on a world entertainment and propaganda tour, and at a mayoral reception in Wellington had a set-to with the Mayoress who seemed to me to suffer from delusions of grandeur .... She said to me in ringing tones that I was never to dare to sing "The Stately Homes of England" again as it was an insult to the homeland and that neither she or anybody else liked it. I replied coldly that for many years it had been one of my greatest successes, whereupon she announced triumphantly to everyone within earshot: 'You see – he can’t take criticism!' Irritated beyond endurance I replied that I was perfectly prepared to take intelligent criticism at any time, but I was not prepared to tolerate bad manners. With this I bowed austerely and left the party. 

Hislop was chairman of the Wellington Provincial Centennial Council and the New Zealand Centennial Exhibition Company from 1937; the Centennial was in 1940.

Honours and awards
In 1935, both Hislop and his wife were awarded the King George V Silver Jubilee Medal. In the 1935 King's Birthday Honours, Hislop was appointed a Companion of the Order of St Michael and St George.

Later life and death
Hislop was High Commissioner to Canada from 1950 to 1957. He died on 21 June 1965 in Montreal, Canada; where his daughter Mrs A. Gordon was living.

Notes

References

No Mean City by Stuart Perry (1969, Wellington City Council) includes a paragraph and a portrait or photo for each mayor.

|-

1888 births
1965 deaths
Mayors of Wellington
New Zealand military personnel of World War I
New Zealand Democrat Party (1934) politicians
High Commissioners of New Zealand to Canada
Unsuccessful candidates in the 1943 New Zealand general election
New Zealand National Party politicians
Unsuccessful candidates in the 1935 New Zealand general election
Wellington City Councillors
People educated at Wellington College (New Zealand)
Candidates in the 1941 New Zealand general election
Alumni of the University of Cambridge
20th-century New Zealand lawyers
New Zealand Companions of the Order of St Michael and St George